Jean Alice Broadhurst (29 December 1873 – 4 September 1954) was an American educator, botanist and bacteriologist, known for her work in detecting the measles virus.

Career
Broadhurst graduated from New Jersey State Normal School in 1892; thereafter joining the school's faculty. She studied at Teachers College, Columbia University in New York City; taught in the department of botany and zoology at Barnard College; and in 1906 joined the Teachers College, Columbia University faculty. Broadhurst earned her Ph.D from Cornell University in 1914, and retired as emerita professor at Teachers College, Columbia University in 1939.

Measles detection

In November 1937, after more than a year of research, Broadhurst announced the discovery of a method of detecting the measles virus before the appearance of the characteristic rash. Utilising the dye nigrosin, Broadhurst and her team succeeded in staining and therefore making visible the inclusion bodies in the virus. Nose and throat specimens from over 160 measles cases were used in the study, which was described in The Journal of Infectious Diseases.

References

Further reading
 
 

1873 births
1954 deaths
20th-century American women scientists
American bacteriologists
American women botanists
American botanists
People from Stockton, New Jersey
Women bacteriologists
Women educators
The College of New Jersey alumni
The College of New Jersey faculty
Barnard College faculty
Teachers College, Columbia University alumni
Teachers College, Columbia University faculty
Cornell University alumni
Educators from New Jersey
Scientists from New Jersey
American women academics